General Sir St. George Gerald Foley  (10 July 1814 – 24 January 1897) was a British Army officer who became Lieutenant Governor of Guernsey.

Military career
Born the son of Thomas Foley, 3rd Baron Foley, Foley was commissioned into the 53rd Regiment of Foot in 1832. He was sent to Malta in 1834. After services as Aide-de-camp to the Commander-in-Chief, Ireland he became Assistant Commissioner at the Headquarters of the French Army in the East and was subsequently awarded the Order of the Medjidie for his service during the Crimean War in 1855. He later took part in the Second Opium War.

He was appointed Lieutenant Governor of Guernsey in 1874.

He was also Honorary Colonel of the South Staffordshire Regiment.

Family
In 1865 he married Augusta Selina Sturt, daughter of Henry Sturt MP. Lady Foley died 21 February 1901. They had two sons.

References

1814 births
1897 deaths
British Army generals
Knights Commander of the Order of the Bath
British Army personnel of the Second Opium War
British Army personnel of the Crimean War
Younger sons of barons
King's Shropshire Light Infantry officers
Recipients of the Order of the Medjidie, 5th class